Bli Bli is a rural town and locality in the Sunshine Coast Region, Queensland, Australia.

Geography

A few kilometres inland from the Maroochydore urban area, Bli Bli rises above the wetlands which were, for many years, the home of the Sunshine Coast sugarcane industry. Whilst this industry is all but gone, state government legislation ensures the wetlands will remain an undeveloped Green Space.

The Maroochy River flows through the locality from north-east (Marcoola) to south-east (Pacific Paradise/Maroochydore).

History
The name Bli Bli is believed to be derived from the Kabi word bilai meaning sheoak tree (Casuarina glauca).

Bli Bli Provisional School opened on 2 April 1901, becoming Bli Bli State School on 1 January 1909.

The first Bli Bli post office opened by March 1903 (a receiving office had been open from 1898) and closed in 1954. The current Bli Bli post office opened on 1 October 1987.

In March 1972, Fairytale Castle was opened; it was later known as the Bli Bli Castle until it was renamed to Sunshine Castle in 2006. The Norman/medieval-style castle was built as a tourist attraction. The castle now houses a medieval museum and serves as an events venue for functions and concerts.

The median age of the Bli Bli population was 39 years, compared to the national median age of 37. 79.3% of people living in Bli Bli were born in Australia. The other top responses for country of birth were England 5.4%, New Zealand 4.2%, Scotland 0.7%, Germany 0.7%, South Africa 0.6%. 93.2% of people spoke only English at home; the next most common languages were 0.5% German, 0.4% Italian, 0.2% Tagalog, 0.2% Japanese, 0.1% Dutch.

Good Samaritan Catholic College opened in 2017.

Heritage listings 
Bli Bli has a number of heritage-listed sites, including:

 87 Willis Road: Bli Bli Public Hall
89 Willis Road: former Bli Bli Presbyterian Church

Education 
Bli Bli State School is a government primary (Prep-6) school for boys and girls at School Road. In 2017, the school had an enrolment of 614 students with 45 teachers (35 full-time equivalent) and 29 non-teaching staff (19 full-time equivalent). It includes a special education program.

Good Samaritan Catholic College is a Catholic primary and secondary school (Prep to Year 12) for boys and girls at 185 Parklakes Drive.

Sunshine Coast Environmental Education Centre is an Outdoor and Environmental Education Centre at Sports Road.

Amenities 
Today Bli Bli has become a conveniently located residential community, it retains its small-town feel, yet is minutes from Sunshine Plaza in Maroochydore, Mudjimba Beach and the Bruce Highway (which forms the western boundary of the locality).

Horton Park Golf Club Maroochydore was relocated to David Low Way in Bli Bli in May 2015. The club was renamed Maroochy River Golf Club and has 18 championship holes with a driving range.

The Sunshine Coast Region council operates a mobile library service which visits the David Low Way.

Bli Bli Uniting Church is at 10-12 Lefoes Road. It is part of the Mary Burnett Presbytery.

The Bli Bli branch of the Queensland Country Women's Association meets at the Uniting Church.

See also 
 List of reduplicated Australian place names

References

External links 

 
 Sunshine Castle, Bli Bli

Suburbs of the Sunshine Coast Region
Towns in Queensland
Localities in Queensland